Sandra Castelló Oliver (born 7 August 1993) is a Spanish footballer who plays as a defender for Sporting de Huelva.

Club career
Castelló started her career at Levante B.

References

External links
Profile at La Liga

1993 births
Living people
Women's association football defenders
Spanish women's footballers
People from Xàbia
Sportspeople from the Province of Alicante
Footballers from the Valencian Community
Levante UD Femenino players
Sporting de Huelva players
Primera División (women) players